Hurricane is the debut studio album by American Idol season 14 winner Nick Fradiani. It was released on August 5, 2016, through Big Machine Records.

Background
Following Fradiani's Idol win, his label offered a non-target PledgeMusic campaign for pre-orders and merchandise sales. During the six weeks before the start of the American Idols LIVE! tour, Fradiani played a number of radio-sponsored concerts, and worked on new songs with writers including Paul Doucette. In September, following the end of the tour, work on the new album intensified. On May 5, 2016, Fradiani revealed the album's release date and title Hurricane, named after a track co-written with Jason Mraz and with Fradiani's Beach Avenue guitarist, Nick Abraham. Starting in late May 2016, Fradiani released snippets of the recorded versions of various songs from the album, sometimes accompanied by "behind the songs" videos.

Singles
The album's lead single "Get You Home" was released on March 11, 2016. A video was shot on March 29 in Chicago, at Virgin Hotels Chicago, with model Michelle Hicks as the female lead. It was directed by Erik White and used real hotel guests as extras. Released on May 19, 2016, the video shows Fradiani having a "cat and mouse game" encounter, starting at the hotel's bar with a beautiful woman who appears to have no scruples, leading to a steamy night at the hotel and a surprise resolution.

A second single, "All On You," was released on August 5, 2016. On December 15, Billboard provided the exclusive premiere of a stark, black-and-white performance video for the song, shot at New Haven's historic Lyric Hall by Ryan Zipp. A video for the album's third single, "Love Is Blind," was released on January 23, 2017, and features Fradiani surprising a real-life bride and groom for their first dance as a married couple.

Track listing

Chart positions
The album debuted at 121 on  the Billboard 200 with sales of 5,000 copies, making it lowest debut from an American Idol winner's first album. It also ranked as #1 on Billboard's Heatseekers chart.

Release history

References

2016 debut albums
19 Recordings albums
Big Machine Records albums
Nick Fradiani albums